The 2017 Stock Car Brasil Championship is the thirty-ninth season of the Stock Car Brasil. The season marks the exit of Peugeot. The manufacturer entered in the series in 2007 and won the championship five times, including the last two seasons.

Teams and drivers
Peugeot retired as manufacturer for the 2017. Therefore, all teams compete with a Chevrolet Cruze Stock Car.

Team changes
A. Mattheis Motorsport, which had raced under the Red Bull sponsorship and name, will now be sponsored by Ipiranga, which left RCM after five seasons. 
Rodolpho Mattheis, who is the son of Andreas Mattheis, will have a new partner this season alongside his father. Xandy Negrão entered at R. Mattheis Motorsport changing his name to RX Mattheis Motorsport. After five seasons, RX and Shell Racing  parted, with RX Mattheis Motorsport receiving the name and sponsor of Prati-Donaduzzi, that did not compete in 2016 and Shell Racing still in the series after concretized a partnership with TMG Motorsport.
After only one season, ProGP and Full Time broke up. Duda Pamplona owner of ProGP started a partnership with remaining team's two times champion Cimed Racing. The team is called Cimed Racing Team, a customer team of Cimed Racing. Full Time Sports started a partnership with Bassani Racing (União Quimica Bassani in 2015 and 2016) creating Full Time Bassani (HERO Motorsport for sponsor). FTS also created a new team called Full Time Academy, a junior team of Full Time Sports expanding to six cars. Having sold his cars to FTS, RZ Motorsport of Ricardo Zonta will not return in 2017, after a difficult season in 2016.
 Blau pharmacy entered the series after purchasing the cars of Boettger Competições that did not compete in 2016 and created a new team called Blau Motorsport. 
C2 Team and Mico's Racing  left the series this season.

Driver changes
Átila Abreu and Ricardo Zonta switched from RX Mattheis-Shell Racing to TMG-Shell Racing. Abreu returned from the team that he competed between 2009 and 2014.
Cacá Bueno and Daniel Serra left Red Bull Racing-A.Mattheis. Bueno joined remaining two times champion Cimed Racing and Serra after ten seasons with Red Bull joined Eurofarma RC. 
Thiago Camilo and Galid Osman left Ipiranga-RCM to join Ipiranga-A.Mattheis. 
Max Wilson was relocated to RCM, the customer team of Eurofarma RC.
Júlio Campos will race for RX Mattheis-Prati-Donaduzzi after one year in your own team C2. Antonio Pizzonia returned as a partner of Campos  after competing in first round in 2016 as wildcard.
Felipe Lappena switched from Bardahl Hot Car  to Cavaleiro Racing. Rafael Suzuki will be your partner after moves from Vogel Motorsport
Valdeno Brito and Gustavo Lima left TMG Motorsport. Brito will race for Eisenbahn Racing Team and Lima to Bardahl Hot Car.
Tuka Rocha raced part-time in 2016 at TMG Motorsport and RZ Motorsport, in 2017 he will race to RCM.
Gabriel Casagrande switched from C2 Team to Vogel Motorsport. Guilherme Salas will be the partner of Casagrande after left RZ Motorsport.
Felipe Fraga, who won the 2016 championship was relocated to Cimed Racing Team, the satellite team of Cimed Racing. Denis Navarro, who raced for Vogel Motorsport in 2016, will be your partner.
Sérgio Jimenez left Cavaleiro Racing to join Bardahl Hot Car.
Bia Figueiredo left União Química Bassani to join the Full Time Academy. Lucas Foresti will be your partner. Foresti still in FTS program, but, now in the junior team.
Alberto Valério returned for the series after six seasons and joined Full Time Bassani.
César Ramos left RZ Motorsport and will race for Blau Motorsport in 2017. Two times Stock Car Brasil second-tier champion, Márcio Campos will be Ramos partner.
Nestor Girolami will not return to 2016. He will focus on Polestar Cyan Racing at World Touring Car Championship. Thiago Marques, Luciano Burti, Danilo Dirani, Felipe Guimarães, Raphael Abbate, Alceu Feldmann, Fábio Carbone, Beto Cavaleiro, Popó Bueno and Xandinho Negrão also will not return for the season.

Mid-season changes
Mico's Racing returned for the series at 9ª Corrida do Milhão Pirelli with Fórmula Truck driver Beto Monteiro. Renato Braga debut in the series at Goiânia.
Felipe Fraga changed his number at 9ª Corrida do Milhão Pirelli, from 88 to 40. Diego Nunes, also changed his number in the last round from 70 to 88.
Portuguese driver António Félix da Costa replaced Alberto Valério at 11° round. In the last round Augusto Farfus raced.

Race calendar and results
The 2017 schedule was announced on 20 December 2016. On March 20, 2017, the calendar was revised with the return of Cascavel and the announcement that the first race would not be held with wildcard drivers. All races take place in Brazil except one round at Autódromo Juan y Óscar Gálvez in Argentina next to the Super TC2000 Argentina in the 200 km stage of Buenos Aires. For the first time, the Corrida do Milhão took place at Autódromo Internacional de Curitiba sponsored by Pirelli, the sponsor of the whole series.

Championship standings
Points system
Points are awarded for each race at an event to the driver/s of a car that completed at least 75% of the race distance and was running at the completion of the race.

Feature races: Used for the first race of each event.
Sprint races: Used for the second race of each event, with partially reversed (top ten) grid.
Million Race: Used for One Million dollars race.
Final race: Used for the last round of the season with double points.

Drivers' Championship

References

External links
  

Stock Car Brasil seasons
Stock Car Brasil season